Wait Till Your Father Gets Home is an animated sitcom produced by Hanna-Barbera Productions that aired in first-run syndication in the United States from 1972 to 1974. The show originated as a one-time segment on Love, American Style called "Love and the Old-Fashioned Father". The same pilot was later produced with a live cast (starring Van Johnson), but with no success. The show was the first primetime animated sitcom to run for more than a single season since fellow Hanna-Barbera show The Flintstones more than ten years earlier, and would be the only one until The Simpsons seventeen years later. The show was inspired by All in the Family.

Premise
The show features Harry Boyle, wife Irma, daughter Alice, and sons Chet and Jamie. Like many animated series created by Hanna-Barbera in the 1970s, the show contained a laugh track created by the studio. For this show, the studio added a third belly laugh to add a little more "variety" (the only TV series made by Hanna-Barbera to have this added laugh). In addition, the laugh track was also slowed considerably.

Episodes

Voice cast
 Tom Bosley as Harry Boyle
 Joan Gerber as Irma Boyle
 Kristina Holland as Alice Boyle
 David Hayward/Lennie Weinrib as Chet Boyle
 Jackie Earle Haley/Willie Aames as Jamie Boyle
 Jack Burns as Ralph Kane
 Veteran Hanna-Barbera voice talents such as Daws Butler, John Stephenson, and Don Messick provided minor roles.

Guest stars

 Don Adams
 Phyllis Diller
 Gene Eugene
 Monty Hall
 Don Knotts
 Rich Little
 Allan Melvin (Also appeared on All In The Family)
 Joe E. Ross
 Isabel Sanford (Also appeared on All In The Family)
 Jonathan Winters
 Casey Kasem (uncredited)
 Pat Morita (uncredited) "The New House"
 Ken Clark (Britain)

Other "guests" on the series included thinly disguised versions of celebrities who did not provide their own voices, such as guru Maharishi Mahesh Yogi. When a crooked car dealer on another episode was perceived by real-life Los Angeles car salesman Cal Worthington as being a send-up of him, he sued the studio (Hanna-Barbera), the sponsors (Chevrolet) and the five NBC-owned stations that carried the show.

Home media 
On June 5, 2007, Warner Home Video released Season 1 of Wait Till Your Father Gets Home on DVD in Region 1 for the Hanna-Barbera Classics Collection. Warner Archive has yet to release season 2 and Season 3.

See also
 List of works produced by Hanna-Barbera Productions

References

External links
 

1970s American adult animated television series
1970s American sitcoms
1972 American television series debuts
1974 American television series endings
American adult animated comedy television series
American animated sitcoms
Animated television series about dysfunctional families
English-language television shows
First-run syndicated television programs in the United States
Television series by Hanna-Barbera